Frances Alexander may refer to:

 Cecil Frances Alexander (1818–1895), Irish poet and hymnodist
 Frances Alexander (politician) (1919–2010), American politician
 Frances E. Alexander (1908–1958), British geologist

See also
Francis Alexander (disambiguation)